Birgitta Sellén (born March 10, 1945) is a Swedish Centre Party politician. She was a member of the Riksdag between 1998 and 2010. In 2006, Sellén became Second Vice Speaker of the Riksdag.

External links 
 Birgitta Sellén at the Riksdag website

1945 births
21st-century Swedish women politicians
Living people
Members of the Riksdag 1998–2002
Members of the Riksdag 2002–2006
Members of the Riksdag 2006–2010
Members of the Riksdag from the Centre Party (Sweden)
Women members of the Riksdag